Pinecrest Bible Training Center is an interdenominational, unaccredited, three-year Bible school in Chesapeake, Virginia.

History
Pinecrest Bible Training Center was founded by Wade Taylor in 1968 in Salisbury Center, New York. Comedian Sam Kinison attended Pinecrest for the academic year 1968–1969.

External links

Unaccredited Christian universities and colleges in the United States
Private universities and colleges in New York (state)
1968 establishments in New York (state)
Educational institutions established in 1968
Bible colleges
Education in Chesapeake, Virginia